West End is a hamlet located in the Borough of Bedford in Bedfordshire, England.

The settlement is close to Carlton, Pavenham and Stevington. West End also forms part of the wider Stevington civil parish.

Hamlets in Bedfordshire
Borough of Bedford